Nymgo (pronounced \ˈnim-ˌgo\) is a software application that makes calls from computers to landlines and mobile phones over the Internet through Voice over Internet Protocol (VoIP). Nymgo is a subsidiary of UK-based Splendor Telecom. It launched in December 2008 as a SIP-enabled, international voice termination provider from fixed devices.

History 

In October 2010, Intel Capital announced that Nymgo would be one of the three companies receiving a Series A investment round from its $50 million start-up fund.

In 2011, Nymgo received a joint investment from Intel Capital and The Abraaj Group for an undisclosed sum. Nymgo has since revamped its networking infrastructure to improve its core voice-only calling business model and has begun the process of rebranding its client apps and website user experience all the while preparing to roll out native smartphone applications for the iPhone and Android OS in early 2012.

Features 
 Nymgo has built proprietary solutions intended to minimize call quality loss from typical VoIP network issues, which is seen as one way to improve upon SIP technology that is geared to optimize quality voice calling.
 Users can send SMS messages from any Nymgo client application.
 Nymgo gives a Caller ID feature, through which customers can customize their own numbers.

Applications and devices 
Nymgo is available on Windows platforms like Windows XP to Windows 7. Nymgo can be used on mobile devices such as Linksys PAP2, Nokia E Series, Nokia N Series, Siemens Gigaset, Fring, Asterisk,  Nimbuzz, X-Lite and Android with Session Initiated Protocol technology.

Rates 
Nymgo's practice of aggressively slashing PC-to-phone calling rates is central to its corporate image, with its rates often being less than half the price offered by Skype. In 2011, Nymgo slashed rates in half to countries with teams participating in the 2010 World Cup.

Customer service 

When a customer encounters poor audio quality, Nymgo will test the line and refund the first two minutes of the call if the test reveals a network error.

Nymgo users periodically complain of dealing with unnecessary obstacles in buying credit (verification procedures, red tape) in certain countries.

References 

VoIP software
VoIP services
Telecommunications companies of the United Kingdom